In West Africa, the Dahomey Gap refers to the portion of the Guinean forest-savanna mosaic that extends all the way to the coast in Benin, Togo, and Ghana, thus separating the forest zone that covers much of the south of the region into two separate parts. The forest region west of the gap is called the Upper Guinean forests or Guinean forest zone, and the portion east of the gap is called the Lower Guinean forests, Lower Guinean-Congolian forests, or Congolian Forest Zone.

The major city in the Gap is Accra. Several other cities, such as Kumasi, exist on the fringe of the Gap.

Causes of dryness
The dryness of the Dahomey Gap is unusual, given that it lies surrounded by a very wet monsoon belt on all sides, and no mountains block moisture. Yet, Accra, which is in the heart of the Gap, receives only  of rainfall per year — less than half the amount needed to sustain tropical rainforest (which would be expected at a latitude of 6° N).

The cause of the dryness of the Dahomey Gap can simply be explained thus:

 In northern winter, high pressure centred on the Sahara sends dry northeasterly trade winds over West Africa, creating a general dry season, including over the Gap.
 In northern summer, an enormous low pressure system known as the monsoon forms over the huge Africa-Asia-Europe landmass. Centred over approximately Rajasthan and prevented by the huge barrier of the Himalayas from moving further west, it extends a strong trough over West Africa. This trough sends warm and saturated westerly winds over West Africa, creating a wet season peaking in June on the coast (as the trough moves north) and in August inland.
 The coast in the region of the highest rainfall (Guinea, Sierra Leone, Liberia) slopes from southeast to northwest. This aspect means that the moist westerlies are forced to shed enormous quantities of moisture, allowing rainforest to thrive despite a distinct dry season.
 In the Dahomey Gap, however, the coast slopes in such a way (northeast to southwest) that the rain-bearing westerlies flow parallel to the coast. This means they are not forced to give up nearly so much moisture, and thus the climate is much drier, with only a brief rainy season in May and June. Consequently, an open savanna prevails adapted to the moderate rainfall and high evaporation in the hot temperatures.

Geological history
Evidence from biogeography suggests that the Dahomey Gap has had significance for up to 90 million years. Murphy and Collier, in their analysis of two aplocheiloid fish genera, show a split in the African species which they attribute to the presence of an epicontinental sea between the late Cenomanian and early Eocene. This discontinuity had earlier been noted in plant species by White and is supported by an analysis of the Coffea clade by Maurin et al.

The Dahomey Gap has existed in its present form for only about four thousand years. For most of the Quaternary, dry conditions due to a much colder Atlantic Ocean (aided by extensive cold currents from ice sheets in Europe and North America) have meant that the present-day forest zone has supported very little or no rainforest. In interglacial periods, however, rainfall throughout West Africa has often been so heavy that the Gap has become wet enough to support rainforest, thus eliminating the savanna.

Notes

Geography of Africa
Geography of Benin
Geography of Togo
Geography of Ghana
Climate of Africa
Geology of Togo